The Litunga of Barotseland (now in Zambia) is the king of the Barotse people. The Litunga resides near the Zambezi River and the town of Mongu, at Lealui on the floodplain in the dry season, and on higher ground at Limulunga on the edge of the floodplain in the wet season. The Litunga moves between these locations in what is known as the Kuomboka ceremony.

The current Litunga is Lubosi II.

List of Litungas

Rulers (title Mbumu wa Litunga)
Nyambe (god)
Mwanasolundwi Muyunda Mumbo wa Mulonga (demigod)
Inyambo
Yeta I 
Ngalama 
Yeta II Nalute 
Ngombala
Yubya
Mwanawina I 
Mwananyanda Liwale
Mulambwa Santulu (1780 – 1830)
Silumelume (1830) – Son of Mulambwa 
Mubukwanu (1830 - 1838) – Son of Mulambwa 
Imasiku (1838) – Son of Mubukwanu

Makololo chiefs (title Morêna)
Sebetwane (1838 - 1851)
Mamochisane (female) (1851) – Daughter of Sebetwane
Sekeletu (1851 - 1863) – Son of Sebetwane and Setlutlu
Mambili (1863)
Liswaniso (in rebellion) (1863)
Mbololo (1863 - 1864) – Brother of Sebetwane

Rulers (title Mbumu wa Litunga)
Sipopa Lutangu (1864 - 1876)
Mowa Mamili – Regent (1876) 
Mwanawina II (1876 - 1878)
Lubosi I (1st time) (1878 - 1884)
Akufuna Tatila (1884 - 1885)
Sikufele (in rebellion) (1885)
Lubosi I (Lewanika I) (2nd time) (1885 - 1916)
Mokamba - Regent (1916)
Yeta III (1916 - 1945), eldest son of Lewanika I
Shemakone Kalonga Wina -Regent (1st time) (1945 - 1946)
Imwiko Lewanika II (1946 - 1948), third son of Lewanika I
Shemakone Kalonga Wina -Regent (2nd time) (1948)
Mwanawina III (1948 - 1968), fifth son of Lewenika I
Hastings Ndangwa Noyoo -Regent (1968)
Godwin Mbikusita Lewanika II (1968 - 1977), ninth son of Lewanika I
Ilute Yeta IV (1977 - 2000), son of Yeta III
Lubosi II Imwiko (2000–Present), son of Imwiko Lewanika II

References

Barotseland
History of Zambia
Zambian culture

Titles of national or ethnic leadership